The Kościół św. Szczepana or Saint Stephen's Church is a church in Katowice, Silesian Voivodship, Poland.

Ludwik Skowronek initiated the building of new church in the Bogucice neighbourhood. It was finished by 1894 and on October 25 of the same year consecrated by cardinal Georg Kopp. In 1994 the church was painted. At its 100th birthday, all former priests visited the church. In July 2006 the Calvari altar was renovated.

Churches completed in 1894
19th-century Roman Catholic church buildings in Poland
Stephen